Dalibor Vašíček (born 16 May 1954) is a retired Czech shot putter.

He finished eighth at the 1981 European Indoor Championships, and won the bronze medal at the 1981 Summer Universiade. Domestically he won the 1981 Czechoslovak indoor championships. 

His personal best put was 19.70 metres, achieved in September 1980 in Budapest.

References

1954 births
Living people
Czech male shot putters
Universiade medalists in athletics (track and field)
Universiade bronze medalists for Czechoslovakia